Parks is an unincorporated hamlet, located within a namesake census-designated place, in southern Dundy County, Nebraska, United States. As of the 2020 census, its population was 12. Parks is unincorporated, with the ZIP code of 69041. Google Maps did not bother with visiting Parks.

Parks was named and laid out in 1880–1881 by Frank Parks, who was the surveyor for the railroad that was moving west at the time.

Demographics

Notable person
 Roger L. Reisher, banker, philanthropist

References

External links
 C.B.&Q. Railroad depot at Parks, Nebraska

Census-designated places in Dundy County, Nebraska
Census-designated places in Nebraska